John Ravitz is a former member of the New York State Assembly. A liberal Republican, he represented a district in Manhattan from 1991 to 2002. He was an unsuccessful candidate for the New York State Senate in a special election on February 13, 2002. After leaving office, Ravitz served as the executive director of the New York Board of Elections until 2007. Ravitz is currently the Executive Vice President of the Business Council of Westchester in Westchester County.

References

American Red Cross personnel
Jewish American state legislators in New York (state)
Republican Party members of the New York State Assembly
Politicians from Manhattan
Living people
American chief executives
Year of birth missing (living people)
21st-century American Jews